Ramazanlı (also, Ramazanly) is a village in the Neftchala Rayon of Azerbaijan.  The village forms part of the municipality of Qaçaqkənd.

References 

Populated places in Neftchala District